is a Japanese singer. Between 2008 and 2013 she was under the recording label Giza Studio and since 2014 she's active as an independent artist.

Early life

Saasa started with music in high school as a guitarist in a rock band. She did not like working with a group, because she couldn't explain herself through the music and decided to go solo. Beginning with acoustic guitar, Saasa changed to electric. Saasa started as a singer-songwriter in 2005 with the debut of her self-made album Good Morning, which was only available at her live concerts.

She continued to perform and released more self-made singles and albums, until Giza Studio became interested. In March 2009, she released her major debut single, called Hello, Hello, Hello (ハローハローハロー). It failed to chart on Oricon. Saasa's first full album was released in July 2009, called Naturela (ナチュリラ). She released 2 more albums before going on hiatus until September 2013. In 2014, she started being active as an indie artist and released her self-made album LeLe Salad, only available in Japan. She's active as of 2019.

Discography

Studio albums 

  (2009)
  (2010)
  (2012)

Singles 

 Hello Hello Hello (ハローハローハロー) (2009)
 Dramatic (ドラマチック) (2009)

Mini-albums 
Hajimemashite (ハジメマシテ。) (Indies) (2008)

Compilations 

 PICK-UP PROJECT '05 Lucky[全12曲収録]twinkle ([全12曲収録] All 12 Songs)(2005)
Christmas Non-Stop Carol (#14 Akabana no Tonakai) (2010)
 fluff (#3 Epuron)

Self-made album and singles 

 Good Morning (2005)
 Cafe Teria (2005)
 Happy (2010)
 1512 café (2011)
 Happy Birthday (2011)
 TOBITATE (2018)
  (2019)
  (2019)

Radio 

2005–2006 TenParu Sunday FM-HANAKO (てんぱる!サンデー　FM-HANAKO)
2005–2006 Mich DJ FM-HANAKO (DJマイセルフ FM-HANAKO)
2014 FM OSAKA
2014.04.25 OBC Radio Osaka (OBCラジオ大阪)
2014.04- KBS Kyoto Radio

TV 

2008 Raw Rikutaimu! (生リクタイム!)
2014– KBS Kyoto TV (KBS京都テレビ) (Responsible for opening Ending BGM program)

References

External links 
  

1984 births
Japanese bloggers
Japanese entertainers
Japanese women pop singers
Living people
Japanese women bloggers
Being Inc. artists
21st-century Japanese singers
21st-century Japanese women singers